Superconductor Science and Technology is a peer-reviewed scientific journal covering research on all aspects of superconductivity, including theories on superconductivity, the basic physics of superconductors, the relation of microstructure and growth to superconducting properties, the theory of novel devices, and the fabrication and properties of thin films and devices. The editor-in-chief is Cathy P Foley (CSIRO). It was established in 1988 and it is published by IOP Publishing. According to the Journal Citation Reports, the journal has an impact factor of 3.219 for 2020.

Article types
The journal publishes articles in the following categories:
 Papers: regular articles reporting original research in superconductivity and its application without formal length restrictions
 Letters: short articles reporting very substantial new advances and no longer than 5 journal pages or 4500 words including figures
 Topical reviews: review papers commissioned by the editors

References

External links 
 

Physics journals
Bimonthly journals
Publications established in 1988
English-language journals
IOP Publishing academic journals
Hybrid open access journals